The supraorbital vein is a vein of the forehead. It communicates with the frontal branch of the superficial temporal vein. It passes through the supraorbital notch, and merges with the angular vein to form the superior ophthalmic vein. The supraorbital vein helps to drain blood from the forehead, eyebrow, and upper eyelid.

Structure 
The supraorbital vein begins on the forehead, where it communicates with the frontal branch of the superficial temporal vein. It runs downward superficial to the frontalis muscle. It merges with the angular vein to form the superior ophthalmic vein.

Previous to its junction with the angular vein, it passes through the supraorbital notch into the orbit around the eye. As this vessel passes through the notch, it receives the frontal diploic vein through a foramen at the bottom of the notch.

Function 
The supraorbital vein helps to drain blood from the forehead, eyebrow, and upper eyelid.

Additional images

References 

Veins of the head and neck